Lofou is a village in the Limassol District of Cyprus, located 5 km northeast of Agios Therapon. Archaeological evidence indicates the area around the village has been inhabited since at least the early to middle Bronze Age.

References

Communities in Limassol District